Pavlikovo is a rural locality (a village) in Fominskoye Rural Settlement, Gorokhovetsky District, Vladimir Oblast, Russia. The population was 13 as of 2010. There are 2 streets.

Geography 
Pavlikovo is located on the Chucha River, 57 km south of Gorokhovets (the district's administrative centre) by road. Povalikhino is the nearest rural locality.

References 

Rural localities in Gorokhovetsky District